José Félix de Vicente Mingo (born 20 November 1962 in Santiago) is a Chilean economist and businessman, former Minister of Economy, Development and Tourism during President Sebastián Piñera's first government.

He studied at Saint George's College. He graduated there in 1981 as the best student in his generation. Then, he graduated as a commercial engineer with a mention in Economics from Universidad de Chile. Here, he led his school's student center in the period 1986–1987.

References

1962 births
Living people
Government ministers of Chile
University of Chile alumni